A legal clinic (also law clinic or law school clinic) is a legal aid or law school program providing services to various clients and often hands-on-legal experience to law school students.  Clinics are usually directed by clinical professors.  Legal clinics typically do pro bono work in a particular area, providing free legal services to clients.

Legal clinics originated as a method of practical teaching of law school students, but today they encompass also free legal aid with no academic links. There are practice-based law clinics with no academic link which provide hands-on skills to lawyers, judges and non-lawyers on practical ethical dimensions of the law at the same time offer free public defence legal services.

Need and importance
According to Avani Bansal, in cases where parties cannot afford a lawyer and are provided legal services by the state, the quality of that legal representation is often questionable. Therefore the need for clinical legal education, or establishing legal aid clinics at law schools, where law students can provide legal advice to indigent people.

Goals, objectives and methods 
Students typically provide assistance with research, drafting legal arguments, and meeting with clients. In many cases, one of the clinic's professors will show up for oral argument before the Court. However, many jurisdictions have "student practice" rules that allow law-clinic students to appear and argue in court.

Areas of service

Clinical legal studies exist in diverse areas such as immigration law, environmental law, intellectual property, housing, criminal defense, criminal prosecution, American Indian law, human rights and international criminal law. Clinics sometimes sue big companies and government entities, which has led to pushback in courts and legislatures, including attempts to put limits on whom clinics can sue without losing state subsidies.

Obstacles
While many jurisdictions have "student practice" rules that allow law-clinic students to appear and argue in court, in some countries like India law students are still studying at law schools and cannot represent the clients in courts by themselves.

According to Avani Bansal in many law schools, clinical legal education is imparted without the support of practical component and lacks policy. Participation in many of these legal clinics lacks academic credits. Lack of resources, lack of trained faculty for the purpose, lack of involvement of Bar Council Members leads to ineffective and weak clinical legal education in countries like India. Communities around are not informed so are not involved. All these aspects frustrate the effective purpose of the Legal clinic in the sense that it neither trains students in practice nor it reaches to the public.

Notable legal clinics

Netherlands
 Utrecht School of Law Clinical Programme on Conflict, Human Rights and International Justice

United States
 Harvard Legal Aid Bureau
Harvard Election Law Clinic
 Stanford Law School Three Strikes Project
 Supreme Court Clinic
 Tulane Environmental Law Clinic
 Yale Law School Supreme Court Clinic

See also
 Legal aid
 Legal awareness
 Legal education
 Street law

References

Legal aid
Legal education